Krypton is a chemical element with symbol Kr and atomic number 36.

Krypton may also refer to:

Krypton (comics), a fictional planet and the birthplace of Kal-El, better known as Superman
Krypton (TV series), a series for SyFy following Superman's grandfather
Kh-31, also known as AS-17 "Krypton", a Russian anti-radar missile
Krypton (band), a Romanian pop-rock band
Krypton (programming language), a frame-based computer programming language
Krypton, Kentucky

Crypton may refer to:
Crypton (fabric), a patented stain prevention fabric treatment
CRYPTON, a block cipher in cryptography
Crypton, deprecated name for mitosome, an organelle in biology
Crypton transposon, a family of DNA transposons
Crypton (particle), a theoretical sub-atomic particle
Crypton Future Media, a Japanese company
Crypton (framework), a cryptographic web framework

See also

 Kryptonite (disambiguation)
 Kr (disambiguation)
 Isotopes of krypton